Aviation Hall of Fame may refer to:

Canada's Aviation Hall of Fame
International Air & Space Hall of Fame, San Diego, US.
National Aviation Hall of Fame, Dayton, US.

See also
:Category:Aviation halls of fame